Japan competed at the 2008 Summer Olympics in Beijing, People's Republic of China.  The delegation of athletes and officials were represented by the Japanese Olympic Committee.

The list of qualified entries for Japan is shown.  In some cases, the country qualified for a position in the Olympic Games, and the individual performance in the qualifying event was good enough to guarantee the same person a spot on Japan's team.  In other cases, the Japan Olympic Committee assigned a competitor at a later date to fill some of the country's qualified positions, and the Olympic competitor may or may not be the same as the one who participated in the qualifying competition.

Medalists

| width="78%" align="left" valign="top" |

| width="22%" align="left" valign="top" |

Archery

Japan qualified four archers (two men and two women) through the 2007 World Outdoor Target Championships individual competitions, and added a third women's qualification spot at the Asian Championships. This allowed Japan to compete in the women's team competition at the Olympics, as well as having three women and two men compete in the individual competitions.
Takaharu Furukawa, Ryuichi Moriya, Nami Hayakawa, Sayoko Kitabatake and Yuki Hayashi were the archers who earned the qualification spots for Japan.

Japan has not yet won an Olympic gold medal in archery; its best results are a pair of silver medals, including Hiroshi Yamamoto's in the 2004 men's individual competition.

Men

Women

Athletics

Men
Track & road events

Field events

Women
Track & road events

Field events

Badminton

Men

Women

Baseball

Japan's victory in the 2007 Asian Baseball Championship qualified the Japan national baseball team for Olympic competition. Japan, along with Cuba, has appeared in every Olympic baseball tournament since the sport was elevated to official status. Japan has reached the semifinals each year and taken one silver and two bronze medals, but has yet to win the Olympic championship.

Roster

Pitchers:
 Yu Darvish
 Kyuji Fujikawa
 Hitoki Iwase
 Kenshin Kawakami
 Yoshihisa Naruse
 Toshiya Sugiuchi
 Masahiro Tanaka
 Koji Uehara
 Tsuyoshi Wada
 Hideaki Wakui

Catchers:
 Shinnosuke Abe
 Tomoya Satozaki
 Akihiro Yano

Infielders:
 Takahiro Arai
 Masahiro Araki
 Munenori Kawasaki
 Shinya Miyamoto
 Shuichi Murata
 Hiroyuki Nakajima
 Tsuyoshi Nishioka

Outfielders:
 Norichika Aoki
 Atsunori Inaba
 Masahiko Morino
 G. G. Sato

Group stage

Group table

Semifinal

Bronze medal game

Boxing

Japan qualified two boxers for the Olympic boxing tournament. Masatsugu was the first when he qualified at the World Championships. Satoshi was the second, qualifying at the first Asian qualifying event.

Canoeing

Slalom

Sprint

Qualification Legend: QS = Qualify to semi-final; QF = Qualify directly to final

Cycling

Road

Track
Japan has qualified entries in men's Keirin, sprint, team sprint and points race, and women's points race and sprint.

Sprint

Keirin

Omnium

Mountain biking

BMX

Diving

One Japanese member qualified for the 3 meter springboard event, by virtue of Ken Terauchi's third-place finish in the semifinal round at the 2007 World Championships. This was the first individual qualification spot earned by Japan for the 2008 Olympics.

Men

Women

Equestrian

Dressage

Eventing

Show jumping

Taizo Sugitani finished qualifying in 37th place which made him a reserve rider for the final. After several qualified horses tested positive for use of capsaicin, he was moved up and participated in Final A.

Fencing 

Men

Women

Field hockey

Women's tournament

Team roster

Group play

9th–10th place

Football (soccer)

Men's tournament
Roster

Group play

Women's tournament
Roster

Group play

Quarterfinals

Semifinals

Bronze medal game

Final rank
4th place

Gymnastics

Artistic
Men
Team

*Due to a coaching decision, Hiroyuki Tomita started in the individual all-around final instead of Koki Sakamoto. Tomita had finished qualification in 6th place, but behind his teammates Uchimura and Sakamoto, and no more than two gymnasts from the same nation are allowed in the final.

Individual finals

Women
Team

Individual finals

Kyoko Oshima qualified for the All-Around final of the top 24 gymnasts because the number of finalists from the same nation is limited to two. Thus, five gymnasts ranked ahead of her were ineligible. For the same reason, Koko Tsurumi appeared in the balance beam apparatus final.

Rhythmic 
Japan have qualified a rhythmic gymnastics group.

Trampoline

Judo

Men

Women

Modern pentathlon

Rowing 

Men

Women

Qualification Legend: FA=Final A (medal); FB=Final B (non-medal); FC=Final C (non-medal); FD=Final D (non-medal); FE=Final E (non-medal); FF=Final F (non-medal); SA/B=Semifinals A/B; SC/D=Semifinals C/D; SE/F=Semifinals E/F; QF=Quarterfinals; R=Repechage

Sailing 

Men

Women

Open

M = Medal race; EL = Eliminated – did not advance into the medal race; CAN = Race cancelled;

Shooting

Men

Women

Softball 

Team roster

Naho Emoto
Motoko Fujimoto
Megu Hirose
Emi Inui
Sachiko Ito
Ayumi Karino
Satoko Mabuchi
Yukiyo Mine
Masumi Mishina
Rei Nishiyama
Hiroko Sakai
Rie Sato
Mika Someya
Yukiko Ueno
Eri Yamada

Preliminary round

Group table

Semifinal

Bronze medal game

The winner of this game advanced to the final while the loser won bronze.

Final

Final rank:

Swimming

Men

Women

* Competed in heats only; WSO - Win swim-off; LSO - Lost swim-off

Synchronized swimming

Table tennis 

Men's singles

Women's singles

Team

Taekwondo

Tennis

Triathlon

Volleyball

Beach

Indoor
Japan qualified teams in both the men's and women's tournaments. The men's team lost all five matches in the group play, finishing last in their group, and failing to qualify for the final round. The men's final ranking was tied for 11th place. The women's team won two of the matches in the group play, and advanced to the quarterfinals, where they lost to Brazil. The women's final ranking was tied for 5th place.

Men's tournament

Roster

Group play

Women's tournament

Roster

Group play

Quarterfinal

Weightlifting

Wrestling 

Japan has qualified in the following quota places.

Men's freestyle

Men's Greco-Roman

Women's freestyle

References

External links
 sports-reference Sports-Reference: Japan at the 2008 Summer Olympics
 Athletics qualifiers at Yahoo! Japan
 Aquatics qualifiers at Yahoo! Japan
 "Japan preview: Veterans lead Olympic delegation to Beijing", Xinhua, July 14, 2007

Nations at the 2008 Summer Olympics
2008
Summer Olympics